USRC Hudson, known for her service during the Battle of Cárdenas, was the United States Revenue Cutter Service's first vessel to have a steel hull and triple-expansion steam engine.

Construction
Hudson was built in the Camden, New Jersey shipyards of John H. Dialogue and Sons and was one of the first Revenue Cutter Service vessels to be completely designed by the service's recently established office of Superintendent of Construction. All of the blueprints and specifications for Hudson were turned over to the shipyard contractor and they were expected to build the vessel according to plan. Prior to establishment of the Superintendent's office by Commandant Leonard G. Shepard, the general layout of the vessel was left to the contractor. Hudson was the first revenue cutter designed with an all steel hull and triple expansion steam engines. Precise metallurgical specifications were used to construct the boiler plates, allowing a 160-pound boiler pressure that allowed the vessel the power to operate very successfully as a tug. Shepard's successor, Charles F. Shoemaker, noted in his Revenue Cutter Service annual report of 1897 that this was "the first and only effort at modern cutter construction up to 1895." When commissioned on 15 September 1893, Hudson was named for the Hudson River which empties into New York harbor.

History

New York Harbor
The crew of the decommissioned New York harbor tug  was sent to Hudson as the crew and she immediately sailed for New York to assume the duties of a harbor tug after commissioning on 15 September 1893. Those duties included customs enforcement, checking ship documentation, quarantine enforcement, assistance to merchant ships, and search and rescue.

Spanish–American War

Hudson was assigned on 24 March 1898 to duty with the U.S. Navy for the Spanish–American War. On 3 April she arrived at the Norfolk Naval Shipyard at Norfolk, Virginia and was outfitted with two six-pound rapid-fire guns and a Colt automatic machine gun. Additionally, the pilothouse was armored with  steel plate. There, shore batteries fired on the U.S. vessels and disabled Winslow, knocking out her steering and a boiler, thereby putting Winslow adrift. The accurate Spanish fire wounded Winslows commanding officer and killed Ensign Worth Bagley and three crewmen. Although under fire from the Spanish guns for over thirty minutes, Hudson, commanded by First Lieutenant Frank H. Newcomb, sailed into the bay to save the disabled Winslow. Newcomb kept Hudson positioned in shoal waters near Winslow, until a line was passed to Winslow and made fast. Hudson then towed Winslow out of danger. During the time in the bay, both vessels continually fired on the Spanish positions. Hudson carried the bodies of those killed as well as the wounded, along with the dispatches of the squadron off Cardenas, to Havana, Cuba, arriving there on 14 May 1898. She remained there on blockade duty for a short time before departing to Key West, Florida. Another period of patrol ended 10 July as she returned to the blockading fleet with further dispatches. Hudson captured two fishing vessels that attempted to run the blockade off Havana. On 17 August Hudson was returned to Treasury Department control and she then departed for Norfolk, via Key West and Savannah, and arrived there on 21 August 1898.

Cardenas Medal

On 27 June 1898, President William McKinley recommended to Congress that the officers and crew of Hudson be awarded medals for their heroic actions at the Bay of Cardenas during the rescue of Winslow. Congress passed legislation awarding the Cardenas Medal to the crew of Hudson on 3 May 1900 (31 Stat. 717, 56th Congress).

Later service
Hudson arrived at New York on 6 October 1898 where she continued with her traditional duties; however, on 24 October she was ordered to Philadelphia, Pennsylvania to participate in a naval parade. She returned to New York after repairs were completed on 27 October. On 26 June she patrolled an intercollegiate regatta at Poughkeepsie, New York returning to New York harbor afterwards. At the declaration of war on Germany by Congress on 6 April 1917 Hudson was once again assigned to the U.S. Navy for service during World War I. On 6 April, she assisted the Collector of Customs at the Port of New York in transfer of the officers of the seized cruise liner Vaterland to Ellis Island for internment. During the war she was assigned port security and customs boarding duties initially, but later outfitted for minesweeping duties near Port Jefferson, New York. After December 1917, Hudson was used to patrol explosive loading barges near the Port of New York. She continued her service with the Navy until returned to Treasury Department control by Executive Order on 28 August 1919. Hudson was sent to Norfork for repairs in 1922, and to the Coast Guard Depot in Curtis Bay, Maryland in 1928; after each yard availability she returned to New York City for regular duties. She was decommissioned on 3 May 1935 and sold.

Awards
Sampson Medal
Spanish Campaign Medal
World War I Victory Medal

Notes
Footnotes

Citations

References used

 
 
 
  
 
 
   
 

Ships of the United States Revenue Cutter Service
Spanish–American War naval ships of the United States
1893 ships
Ships built by Dialogue & Company